Mihai Stere (born 30 December 1975) is a Romanian former footballer who played as a midfielder. He played in his career for teams such as: Farul Constanța, Brașov, Nea Salamina, Aris Limassol and Târgu Mureș, among others. After retirement Stere started his football manager career being assistant coach at Brașov and head coach at Precizia Săcele.

External links
 
 

1975 births
Living people
Sportspeople from Constanța
Romanian footballers
Association football midfielders
Liga I players
Liga II players
FCV Farul Constanța players
FC Brașov (1936) players
CS Concordia Chiajna players
CSM Corona Brașov footballers
ASA 2013 Târgu Mureș players
Cypriot First Division players
Nea Salamis Famagusta FC players
Aris Limassol FC players
Romanian expatriate footballers
Expatriate footballers in Cyprus
Romanian expatriate sportspeople in Cyprus
Romanian football managers
FC Brașov (1936) managers